The Grand Avenue Village Association (GAVA) is a membership based, non-profit organization composed primarily of local merchants along Grand Avenue, in the Fair Haven neighborhood of New Haven, Connecticut. GAVA was created in 1999 by a group of merchants with support from the City of New Haven.

Purpose 
GAVA's mission is primarily to improve the business climate of the Fair Haven neighborhood, improve the public perception of commercial opportunities, and assist merchants in increasing capacity and generating profit.

Membership 
GAVA is a very “hands on”, on-the-street organization, which spends considerable time interacting with its membership, providing direct assistance and networking. Its membership comprises sixty-five companies, with a core group of six representatives serving on its executive board. Retailers and restaurants make up the majority of members, with service firms, contractors and wholesalers also represented.

Local impact 
The impact that GAVA has had on the Fair Haven community and local businesses since its inception has been considerable. For example, GAVA has successfully held community clean-ups, which are now held on a monthly basis.  The organization has provided technical assistance, access to business planning and financing to small businesses. It has also been instrumental in the development and architectural planning to the Grand Avenue commercial corridor.

GAVA also continues to support and host events in the Festival of Arts and Ideas, a popular annual festival held each summer in New Haven, Connecticut.

References

External links
www.grandnewhaven.com
www.artidea.org
"Peace Breaks Out on Grand Avenue" Article from New Haven Independent

Economy of New Haven, Connecticut
Non-profit organizations based in Connecticut